Rage (stylised as rage) is an all-night Australian music video program broadcast on ABC Television since 1987, hosted by a large number of guest presenters since 1990. This article lists the presenters to date.

Background

Starting with Andrew Denton in 1990, Rage has a long tradition of inviting a band or artist host the show for the Saturday night episode. The hosts select and introduce their favourite music videos from the Rage library. This gives an insight into the bands' and artists' influences, which are highly regarded by fans whose tapings of the program are highly sought after. Rage has had hundreds of artists host the show over its vast history, as well as politicians, comedians, writers, TV hosts and other figures in the music and entertainment industry. Mike Patton, Bernard Fanning and Tex Perkins have guest programmed the show the most, having appeared five times apiece.

rage often filmed their guest presenters in various hotels, backstage green rooms, bars, and parts of the ABC building, including the triple j conference room in Ultimo, Sydney. They now mostly film out of their own purpose-built rage studio in ABC Ultimo, Sydney, but also at music festivals and occasionally in musician's homes and hotels. 

From March 2020, when COVID-19 pandemic restrictions began to be rolled out in Australia, rage permitted select artists to guest program the show over video call. The nearly two-year-long studio filming hiatus for international guests lasted from March 18, 2020, until March 9, 2022, when Gavin Rossdale from Bush filmed a guest program in the rage studio to coincide with Australia's first international tour since the onset of the Covid-19 pandemic, the Under The Southern Stars concert series.

Multiple-time guest programmers

Artists and groups that have guest programmed Rage three or more times include:

Guest programmers by year

1990
 Jan 6: Andrew Denton
 Jan 7: Amanda Brown from The Go-Betweens 
 Jan 12: Kate Ceberano
 Jan 13: Ed Kuepper
 Jan 19: Rob Hirst from Midnight Oil
 Jan 20: Neil Murray from The Rainmakers and warumpi band
 Jan 26: Alannah Russack from the Hummingbirds
 Jan 27: Damien Lovelock from The Celibate Rifles
 Mar 3: Maynard F Crabbes
 Apr 7: Mark Seymour from Hunters & Collectors
 May 26: Claudia Castle
 Aug 11: Mike Patton from Faith No More
 Oct 6: Steve Tyler, Joe Perry & Tom Hamilton from Aerosmith
 Nov 24: Jimmy Barnes
 Dec 15: Concrete Blonde
Source:

1991
 Jan 4: Flavor Flav from Public Enemy
 Jan 5: Stephen Cummings
 Jan 11: Reg Mombassa from Mental As Anything
 Jan 12: Jenny Morris
 Jan 18: Suzie Higgie from the Falling Joys
 Jan 19: Tex Perkins from The Cruel Sea
 Jan 25: The Hard Ons
 Jan 26: James Valentine
 Feb 23: Pop Will Eat Itself
 Mar 16: Billy Joel
 Apr 6: Bob Geldof from The Boomtown Rats
 Apr 20: Christina Amphlett from The Divinyls
 May 4: Susanna Hoffs from The Bangles
 May 18: Paul Kelly
 Jun 1: Mike Edwards from Jesus Jones
 Jun 22: Lemmy from Motörhead
 Jul 13: Capital Q from Dream Warriors
 Sep 7: Siouxsie & The Banshees
 Sep 14: Elvis Costello
 Sep 21: Derry Brownson from EMF
 Sep 27: Turbo B from Snap
 Oct 12: Vince Neil from Mötley Crüe
 Oct 19: Posdnous from De La Soul
 Nov 2: Gary Clail
 Nov 9: Lars Ulrich from Metallica
Source:

1992
 Jan 3: Mandawuy Yunupingu from Yothu Yindi
 Jan 4: Jon Stevens from Noiseworks
 Jan 10: Deborah Conway from Do-re'-me
 Jan 11: Ratcat
 Jan 17: Richard Pleasance
 Jan 18: Helen Razer from Triple J
 Jan 24: Dave Faulkner from the Hoodoo Gurus
 Jan 25: The Clouds
 Feb 1: Tortelvis from Dread Zeppelin
 Feb 8: Pat DiNizio from The Smithereens
 Feb 15: Ned's Atomic Dustbin
 Feb 22: The Violent Femmes
 Mar 7: Neil Finn, Paul Hester & Nick Seymour from Crowded House
 Mar 21: Henry Rollins
 Mar 28: Fishbone
 Apr 11: Joe Elliot from Def Leppard
 Apr 18: Mick Harvey and Nick Cave from Nick Cave & the Bad Seeds
 May 2: Mick Jones from Big Audio Dynamite II and The Clash
 May 9: Julian Lennon
 May 16: Billy Bragg
 May 23: Steve Kilbey from The Church
 Oct 10: Kylie Minogue
Source:

1993
 May 8: Michael Hutchence from INXS
 Aug 28: Winner of the Rage/Triple J Video Hottest 100 competition
 Sep 4: World Party
 Sep 11: Vernon Reid from Living Colour
 Sep 18: Baby Animals
 Oct 2: Tex Perkins and Ken Gormly of The Cruel Sea
 Oct 9: Siouxsie & The Banshees
 Oct 16: Dean and Gene Ween from Ween
 Oct 30: Ice-T from Body Count
Source:

1994
 Jan 6: Evan Dando from The Lemonheads
 Jan 13: Tiny Tim
 Jan 20: Terence Trent D'arby
 Jan 27: Layne Staley from Alice In Chains
 Feb 12: The Breeders
 Feb 19: Chris Cornell from Soundgarden
 Feb 26: Kirsty MacColl
 Apr 2: k.d. Lang
 Apr 16: Elvis Costello
 May 28: Ice cube & Others
 Jun 4: Billy Thorpe from Billy Thorpe & the Aztecs
 Jun 11: Fiona Horne from Def FX
 Jun 25: D.I.G.
 Jul 2: Matt Deighton from Mother Earth & Eddie Piller
 Aug 13: Bad Brains
 Aug 27: Beck
 Sep 3: Ru Paul
 Sep 10: Max Cavalera & Andreas Kisser from Sepultura
 Sep 17: Lydia Lunch
 Oct 1: Triple J's Jaslyn Hall
 Oct 8: Frank Black from The Pixies
 Oct 15: Page Hamilton from Helmet
 Oct 22: The Beastie Boys
 Nov 12: Michael Franti and Mary Harris from Spearhead
 Nov 19: Diesel
 Dec 24: Nick Cave from Nick Cave & The Bad Seeds and The Birthday Party
Source:

1995
 Feb 4: Grant Lee Buffalo
 Feb 11: Mike Mills from R.E.M.
 Feb 18: Ian Astbury from The Cult
 Mar 11: Hole
 Mar 18: aki & Dave from Fun-Da-Mental
 Apr 1: Slash from Guns N' Roses and Snakepit
 Apr 8: Paul Barker from Ministry
 Apr 15: Throwing Muses
 Apr 22: Mark Lanegan & Van Conner from Screaming Trees
 Apr 29: Edwyn Collins
 May 6: Ed Kowalczyk and Patrick Dahlheimer from Live
 May 20: TISM
 May 27: Primal Scream
 Jun 3: Jennifer Finch and Suzi Gardner from L7
 Jun 17: William and Jim Reid from The Jesus & Mary Chain
 Jul 1: Mike Muir from Suicidal Tendencies
 Jul 8: Massive Attack
 Jul 22: Richie Lewis and Lenny Curley from Tumbleweed
 Aug 5: Robb Flynn and Logan Mader from Machine Head
 Aug 19: Chris Isaak & Kenney Dale Johnson
 Sep 2: Mike Patton and Roddy Bottum from Faith No More
 Sep 9: Daniel Johns, Ben Gillies and Chris Joannou from Silverchair
 Sep 16: Ray Manzarek from The Doors & Danny Sugarman (The Doors manager / biographer)
 Sept 30: You Am I
Source:

1996
 Jan 6: Butch Vig from Garbage
 Feb 17: Dave Graney and Clare Moore
 Mar 9: Perry Farrell from Porno for Pyros
 Mar 16: Maxim, Keith Flint, Leeroy Thornhill & Liam Howlett from The Prodigy
 Apr 6: Buffalo Tom
 Apr 13: Elastica
 Apr 20: The Tea Party
 Apr 27: Ian Brown from the Stone Roses
 May 4: k.d. Lang
 May 11: Fear Factory
 May 18: Paul D'Amour from Tool
 Jun 1: James Hetfield and Jason Newsted from Metallica
 Jun 22: James Iha and D'arcy from the Smashing Pumpkins
 Jul 13: Malcolm McLaren
 Aug 10: Quan Yeomans, Ben Ely & Martin Lee from Regurgitator
 Aug 17: The Presidents of the USA
 Aug 28: Pollyanna
 Sept 14: Robert Forster from The Go-Betweens
 Sep 21: Custard
 Oct 5: Insurge
 Oct 12: Everclear
 Oct 19: Bernard Fanning, Ian Haug & John Collins from Powderfinger
 Oct 26: Neneh Cherry
 Nov 9: Shirley Manson and Steve Marker from Garbage
 Nov 16: Stan Ridgway
 Nov 30: Brian Bell & Matt Sharp from Weezer
 Dec 7: The Fauves
 Dec 14: Ash
 Dec 21: Gavin Rossdale & Nigel Pulsford from Bush
Source:

1997
 Feb 8: Lauryn Hill, Wyclef Jean and Pras Michel from The Fugees
 Feb 15: Barry Adamson
 Feb 22: Gavin Rossdale and Nigel Pulsford from Bush
 Mar 15: Greg Graffin and Jay Bentley from Bad Religion
 Mar 22: Spiderbait
 Mar 29: Gaz Coombes and Mick Quinn from Supergrass
 Apr 5: Henry Rollins and Chris Haskett from the Rollins Band
 Apr 12: Tracey Thorn and Ben Watt from Everything But The Girl
 Apr 26: BIS
 May 10: Local H
 May 17: Magic Dirt
 May 24: Jonathan Davis, Brian Welch and Reginald Arvizu from Korn
 May 31: Ed Kowalczyk and Patrick Dahlheimer from Live (repeat of the 6 May 1995 episode):
 Jun 21: Paul Kelly
 Jul 12: Rail
 Jul 19: The Mark of Cain
 Aug 9: Screamfeeder
 Aug 16: Steve Malkmus and Mark Ibold from Pavement
 Aug 30: Sidewinder
 Sep 6: The Blackeyed Susans
 Sep 20: Alice Cooper
 Oct 11: Ben Folds Five
 Oct 18: Dave Faulkner and Brad Shepherd from The Hoodoo Gurus
 Oct 25: Nina Gordon and Louise Post from Veruca Salt
 Nov 1: Jimmy Pop and Lupus Thunder from The Bloodhound Gang
 Nov 8: Devo
 Nov 15: Cake
 Nov 29: Mike Patton, Roddy Bottum, & Mike Bordin from Faith No More
 Dec 6: Jebediah
Source:

1998
 Feb 14: Ben Harper and the Innocent Criminals
 Mar 7: Phil and Ed from Radiohead
 Mar 14: Phil Jamieson and Joe Hansen from Grinspoon
 Mar 21: Dave Grohl and Franz Stahl from Foo Fighters
 Mar 28: Stone Gossard from Brad/Pearl Jam and Regan Hagar from Brad
 Apr 4: The Whitlams
 Apr 18: Tanya Donelly
 Apr 25: Billie Joe Armstrong, Tre Cool and Mike Dirnt from Green Day
 May 2: Ammonia
 May 9: Arkarna
 May 23: Les Claypool from Primus
 May 30: Warren Ellis, Jim White and Mick Turner from Dirty Three
 Jun 13: Frenzal Rhomb
 Jun 27: Mark Hoppus, Tom DeLonge and Scott Raynor from Blink 182
 Jul 25: Tex Perkins and James Cruickshank from The Cruel Sea
 Aug 8: Natasha Schaade (Triple J's Hottest 100 Of All Time winner)
 Aug 22: Dicky Barrett and Joe G from The Mighty Mighty Bosstones
 Sep 12: Snout
 Sep 19: Janet English and Quan Yeomans from Happyland
 Oct 3: Paul McDermott and Mikey Robins
 Oct 17: Thurston Moore and Lee Ranaldo from Sonic Youth
 Oct 31: Marcy Playground
 Nov 7: The Living End
 Nov 14: The Cruel Sea (repeat of the 25 July 1998 episode)
 Nov 21: The Dandy Warhols
 Nov 28: Richard Kingsmill from Triple j radio
 Dec 12: The Superjesus
 Dec 19: Slayer
Source:

1999
 Feb 6: Marilyn Manson
 Feb 13: Ben Lee
 Feb 20: Courtney Love, Eric Erlandson, Melissa Auf der Maur and Samantha Maloney from Hole
 Feb 27: Pauline Pantsdown and Vanessa Wagner
 Mar 20: Huey from Fun Lovin' Criminals
 Mar 27: James and Nicky from Manic Street Preachers
 Apr 3: Tim Rogers from You Am I
 Apr 17: Not From There
 Apr 24: Jon Spencer Blues Explosion
 May 1: Billy Bragg
 May 8: Robert Forster & Grant McLennan From The Go-Betweens
 May 15: Placebo
 May 22: Gerling
 May 29: Courtney Love,  Eric Erlandson, Melissa Auf der Maur and Samantha Maloney from Hole (repeat of the 20 February 1999 episode)
 Jun 5: Billie Joe Armstrong, Mike Dirnt and Tre Cool from Green Day (repeat of the 25 April 1998 episode)
 Jun 12: Mix Master Mike
 Jul 3: Something for Kate
 Jul 10: Marilyn Manson (repeat of the 6 February 1999 episode)
 Jul 17: Custard
 Jul 24: Derrick Green & Igor Cavalera from Sepultura
 Jul 31: Reef
 Aug 7: Moby
 Aug 14: Merrick and Rosso
 Aug 28: Richard and Geno from Filter
 Sep 4: Silverchair
 Sep 11: Dave Wyndorf & Phil Caivano from Monster Magnet
 Sep 25: Rebecca and Shane from Rebecca's Empire
 Oct 2: Alex Lloyd
 Oct 16: Brett, Simon and Mat from Suede
 Oct 23: Jon, Tom and Karl from Shihad
 Oct 30: Placebo (repeat of the 15 May 1999 episode)
 Nov 6: Jonathan, Grasshopper and Justin from Mercury Rev
 Nov 13: Shirley Manson, Butch Vig, Duke Erikson and Steve Marker from Garbage
 Dec 18: Killing Heidi
Source:

2000
 Feb 26: Trent Reznor from NIN
 Mar 11: Ian Ball & Olly Peacock from Gomez
 Mar 18: Corey, Shawn & Joey from Slipknot
 Mar 25: Apollo 440
 Apr 1: Beth Orton
 Apr 8: Ed Kowalczyk from Live
 Apr 29: Sugar Ray
 May 6: sonicanimation
 Jun 3: Gwen Stefani, Tom Dumont, Tony Kanal and Adrian Young from No Doubt
 Jun 10: Trent Reznor from Nine Inch Nails (repeat of the 26 February 2000 episode) 
 Jun 24: Groove Terminator
 Jul 8: Moby (repeat of 7 August 1999 episode)
 Jul 22: Friendly
 Jul 29: 28 Days
 Aug 5: Gomez (repeat of 11 March 2000 episode)
 Aug 12: Billy, Maynard and Troy from A Perfect Circle
 Sep 2: Powderfinger
 Sep 9: Bodyjar
 Sep 16: MXPX
 Sep 23: Fuel
 Oct 7: The Fauves
 Oct 28: Christine Anu
 Nov 11: Fatboy Slim
 Dec 9: The Avalanches
 Dec 16: Tex Perkins
 Dec 23: Augie March
Source:

2001
 Feb 17: Boss Hog
 Feb 24: Chris Martin and Jonny Buckland from Coldplay
 Mar 3: Bob Downe and Vanessa Wagner
 Mar 10: will.i.am, Taboo and apl.de.ap from Black Eyed Peas
 Mar 17: Josh Homme and Nick Oliveri from Queens of the Stone Age
 Mar 24: Shaun Ryder from Happy Mondays
 Mar 31: Gene Simmons and Paul Stanley from Kiss
 Apr 14: Lotel
 Apr 28: At The Drive In
 May 5: Roni Size/Reprazent
 May 12: Chris Martin and Jonny Buckland from Coldplay (repeat of the 24 February 2001 episode) 
 May 26: Motor Ace
 Jun 9: Pantera
 Jun 16: Chester Bennington, Brad Delson & Rob Bourdon from Linkin Park
 Jun 23: Bomfunk MC's
 Jun 30: Gene Simmons and Paul Stanley from Kiss (repeat of the 31 March 2001 episode) 
 Jul 28: paulmac
 Aug 11: The Strokes
 Aug 18: Stephen Malkmus
 Aug 25: Michael Franti and RadioActive from Spearhead
 Sep 8: Travis
 Sep 22: Eskimo Joe
 Oct 13: Stella One Eleven
 Oct 20: Butthole Surfers
 Nov 17: The John Butler Trio
 Dec 1: Resin Dogs
 Dec 15: Scott & PK from Unwritten Law
 Dec 22: Posdnous, Trugoy and Maseo from De La Soul
Source:

2002
 Feb 9: Bernard Sumner, Peter Hook and Stephen Morris from New Order
 Feb 16: Alien Ant Farm
 Feb 23: Ryan Adams
 Mar 2: Stephen Allkins A.K.A. Love Tattoo
 Mar 9: Shavo Odadjian & John Dolmayan from System of a Down
 Mar 16: Basement Jaxx
 Mar 23: Andrew W.K.
 Mar 30: David Byrne
 Apr 6: Incubus
 Apr 13: George
 Apr 20: They Might Be Giants
 Apr 27: Jurassic 5
 May 4: Crystal Method
 May 18: Groove Armada
 May 25: Jebediah
 Jun 1: Faithless
 Jun 8: One Dollar Short
 Jun 22: Bluebottle Kiss
 Jun 29: Grinspoon
 Jul 13: Jack Black and Kyle Gass from Tenacious D
 Jul 27: Andrew Haug from Triple J
 Aug 10: Supergrass
 Aug 17: Black Rebel Motorcycle Club
 Aug 24: Doves
 Aug 31: Jon Toogood & Tom Larkin from Pacifier
 Sep 7: Machine Gun Fellatio
 Sep 14: Tom Gray & Olly Peacock from Gomez
 Sep 28: Kasey Chambers
 Oct 5: The Vines
 Oct 19: Dave Grohl, Taylor Hawkins, Chris Shiflett and Nate Mendel from the Foo Fighters
 Oct 26: Superheist
 Nov 9: The Streets
 Nov 16: ...And You Will Know Us by the Trail of Dead
 Dec 14: Dominic, Barry & John from Mogwai
 Dec 21: Max Cavalera from Soulfly
Source:

2003
 Feb 8: Karl Hyde from Underworld
 Feb 22: Josh Homme and Nick Oliveri from Queens of the Stone Age (repeat of 17 Mar 2001 episode)
 Mar 1: Perry Farrell, Dave Navarro, Stephen Perkins and Chris Chaney from Jane's Addiction
 Mar 8: Xzibit
 Mar 15: Jimmy Eat World
 Mar 22: The Music
 Apr 5: Wil Anderson
 Apr 12: Beck
 Apr 26: Stephen Carpenter, Abe Cunningham & Frank Delgado from Deftones
 May 3: Badly Drawn Boy
 May 10: Yeah Yeah Yeahs
 May 17: John Stirratt & Glenn Kotche from Wilco
 May 24: Murderdolls
 May 31: Sleater Kinney
 Jun 7: Grandmaster Flash
 Jun 14:Chris Cornell, Brad Wilk, Tom Morello & Tim Commerford from Audioslave
 Jun 21: The Datsuns
 Jul 5: Lou Barlow
 Jul 12: Sleek The Elite
 Jul 19: The Music
 Jul 26: The Sleepy Jackson
 Aug 9: Placebo
 Aug 16: Amiel
 Aug 23: Courtney Taylor-Taylor & Brent DeBoer from The Dandy Warhols
 Aug 30: Beck (repeat of the 12 April 2003 episode)
 Sep 6: Debbie Harry, Clem Burke and Jimmy Destri from Blondie
 Sep 13: Something for Kate
 Sep 20: AFI
 Sep 27: Cat Power
 Oct 4: E from the Eels
 Oct 11: The Living End
 Oct 18: Ben Lee
 Nov 1: Fat Mike from NOFX and Me First And The Gimme Gimmes
 Nov 8: Har Mar Superstar
 Nov 29: Skulker
 Dec 6: Dexter Holland & Noodles from The Offspring
 Dec 13: Super Furry Animals
 Dec 20: Chris Cornell, Brad Wilk, Tom Morello & Tim Commerford from Audioslave (repeat of the 14 June 2003 episode)
Source:

2004
 Feb 7: The Darkness
 Feb 28: Lars Ulrich and Robert Trujillo from Metallica
 Mar 6: Róisín Murphy from Moloko
 Mar 13: Jet
 Mar 20: Wayne Coyne from The Flaming Lips
 Mar 27: Gang Starr
 Apr 3: Muse
 Apr 10: Kings of Leon
 Apr 17: The Cat Empire
 Apr 24: Afrika Bambaataa
 May 1: Guy Garvey & Pete Turner from Elbow
 May 15: The Dissociatives
 May 22: Panjabi MC
 May 29: Scott Ian, John Bush & Joey Vera from Anthrax
 Jun 5: Grandaddy
 Jun 12: 1200 Techniques
 Jun 26: Andre 3000 from Outkast
 Jul 3: Kim Gordon and Thurston Moore from Sonic Youth
 Jul 17: Wanda Dee vocalist for The KLF
 Jul 24: Jungle Brothers
 Jul 31: Franz Ferdinand
 Aug 7: Cyndi Lauper
 Aug 14: Ash
 Aug 21: Pete Murray
 Aug 28: Ozomatli
 Sep 11: Ben Kweller
 Sep 18: Belle and Sebastian
 Sep 25: Butterfingers
 Oct 2: Goodshirt
 Oct 9: Jet
 Oct 16: Infusion
 Oct 23: Tripod
 Oct 30: Jean-Jacques Burnel, Baz Warne & Paul Roberts from The Stranglers
 Nov 6: Sum41
 Nov 20: Little Birdy
 Nov 27: Robbie Buck
 Dec 4: Devendra Banhart
 Dec 11: Rocket Science
 Dec 18: Missy Higgins
Source:

2005
 Feb 5: The Hives
 Feb 19: Eskimo Joe
 Feb 26: The Polyphonic Spree
 Mar 5: Jake Shears, Del Marquis & Paddy Boom from Scissor Sisters
 Mar 12: The Donnas
 Mar 19: Slash & Dave Kushner from Velvet Revolver
 Mar 26: Freestylers
 Apr 2: Speech from Arrested Development
 Apr 16: Le Tigre
 Apr 23: Mylo
 Apr 30: Maxim, Keith Flint & Liam Howlett from The Prodigy
 May 7: The Black Keys
 May 14: Lyrics Born
 May 21: Jack Johnson, Donavon Frankenreiter and G. Love
 May 28: Bent
 Jun 4: Scribe
 Jun 11: The Used
 Jun 18: Handsome Boy Modeling School
 Jun 25: Tori Amos
 Jul 2: Mudvayne
 Jul 9: Stereophonics
 Jul 16: Shihad
 Jul 30: End of Fashion
 Aug 20: Queens of the Stone Age
 Aug 27: Billy Corgan from  The Smashing Pumpkins
 Sep 3: Bloc Party
 Sep 10: Magic Dirt
 Sep 17: Don Letts
 Sep 24: Interpol
 Oct 1: Queens of the Stone Age (repeat of the 20 August 2005 episode)
 Oct 8: The Bravery
 Oct 15: Fozzy
 Oct 22: Britt Daniel from Spoon
 Oct 29: Kisschasy
 Nov 5: Sarah Blasko
 Nov 12: Spiderbait
 Nov 26: Bernard Fanning
 Dec 3: Hot Hot Heat
 Dec 10: Wolfmother
 Dec 17: Teenage Fanclub
 Dec 24: The Strokes
Source:

2006
 Feb 4: My Chemical Romance
 Feb 11: Roots Manuva
 Feb 25: Kaiser Chiefs
 Mar 4: Millencolin
 Mar 11: Sons And Daughters
 Mar 18: Hilltop Hoods
 Mar 25: Antony from Antony and the Johnsons
 Apr 1: Faker
 Apr 8: The Go! Team
 Apr 15: Ugly Duckling
 Apr 22: Soulwax
 Apr 29: Dresden Dolls
 May 6: Maynard James Keenan & Danny Carey from Tool
 May 13: Datarock
 May 20: You Am I
 May 27: MIA
 Jun 10: Gyroscope
 Jun 17: Martha Wainwright
 Jun 24: Shout Out Louds
 Jul 1: Annie
 Jul 15: Youth Group
 Jul 22: Hilltop Hoods (repeat of the 18 March 2006 episode)
 Jul 29: After The Fall
 Aug 5: The Sleepy Jackson
 Aug 12: DJ Shadow
 Aug 19: Dirty Three
 Sep 2: Tom Morello
 Sep 9: The Zutons
 Sep 16: The Butterfly Effect
 Sep 23: Death Cab For Cutie
 Sep 30: Snow Patrol
 Oct 7: Radio Birdman
 Oct 21: Lily Allen
 Oct 28: TV On The Radio
 Nov 4: Zakk Wylde from Black Label Society
 Nov 11: Panic At The Disco
 Nov 25: Def Wish Cast
 Dec 2: Joan As Police Woman
 Dec 9: Hard-Fi
 Dec 16: We Are Scientists
 Dec 23: Infadels
Source:

2007
 Feb 3: Tapes 'N Tapes
 Feb 10: Kasabian
 Feb 24: Hot Chip
 Mar 3: Trivium
 Mar 10: Josh Pyke
 Mar 24: Peaches
 Mar 31: Mike D, Adam Yauch and Ad Rock from the Beastie Boys
 May 5: Peter Bjorn and John
 May 12: +44
 May 19: Wolf & Cub
 May 26: Timo Maas
 Jun 2: Unwritten Law
 Jun 9: Jarvis Cocker from Pulp
 Jun 16: Fall Out Boy
 Jun 23: Jenny Wilson
 Jun 30: Boots Electric from Eagles of Death Metal
 Jul 7: 30 Seconds To Mars
 Jul 14: The Rapture
 Jul 21: Hatebreed
 Jul 28: Phoenix
 Aug 4: Matt Sharawara, winner of invade rage competition
 Aug 11: Jamie T
 Aug 25: Dappled Cities Fly
 Sep 1: Cold War Kids
 Sep 8: Clutch
 Sep 15: Editors
 Sep 22: Mike Patton & Imani Coppola from Peeping Tom
 Sep 29: Pop Levi
 Oct 6: Maxïmo Park
 Oct 13: Tilly and the Wall
 Oct 20: The Horrors
 Oct 27: Architecture In Helsinki
 Nov 3: James Lavelle
 Nov 10: Expatriate
 Nov 24: Gotye
 Dec 31: The Chaser
Source:

2008
 Feb 2: Klaxons
 Feb 9: Clare Bowditch
 Feb 16: The Gossip
 Mar 1: Andrew Weatherall
 Mar 8: Battles
 Mar 15: Dizzee Rascal
 Mar 22: Shy Child
 Mar 29: Enter Shikari
 Apr 5: Calvin Harris
 Apr 12: The Matches
 Apr 19: Digitalism
 Apr 26: The Panics
 May 3: Anti-Flag
 May 10: The Mess Hall
 May 17: Kate Nash
 May 24: Alexisonfire
 May 31: Cut Copy
 Jun 14: Bliss N Eso
 Jun 21: The Paper Scissors
 Jun 28: Cog
 Jul 5: Tiesto
 Jul 12: Jim Lindberg and Fletcher Dragge from Pennywise
 Jul 19: The Presets
 Jul 26: Liam Finn
 Aug 2: Utah Saints
 Aug 16: Katalyst
 Aug 23: Cedric Bixler-Zavala and Omar Rodríguez-López from The Mars Volta
 Aug 30: Bonde Do Rolê
 Sep 6: Tricky
 Sep 20: The Herd
 Sep 27: The Fratellis
 Oct 4: MSTRKRFT
 Oct 11: The Kooks
 Oct 18: Anton Newcombe from The Brian Jonestown Massacre
 Oct 25: Pnau
 Nov 1: Muph & Plutonic
 Nov 8: British India
 Nov 15: Van She
 Nov 22: Something With Numbers
 Nov 29: Sparkadia
 Dec 13: The Grates
 Dec 20: Blackalicious

2009
 Feb 7: MGMT
 Feb 14: Mark Ronson
 Feb 21: The Drones
 Mar 7: Busy P
 Mar 14: Bill Callahan
 Mar 21: Lupe Fiasco
 Mar 28: Bloc Party
 Apr 4: Lawrence Leung
 Apr 11: Bullet for My Valentine
 Apr 18: Justin Vernon of Bon Iver
 May 2: Cansei de Ser Sexy
 May 9: The Charlatans
 May 23: Howling Bells
 May 30: Gary Numan
 Jun 6: Tim Minchin
 Jun 20: TZU
 Jun 27: Franz Ferdinand
 Jul 4: Eddie Perfect
 Jul 11: Jessica Mauboy
 Jul 18: Mark Ramone from The Ramones
 Jul 25: Ben Harper and Relentless7
 Aug 15: Mia Dyson
 Aug 22: Pendulum
 Aug 29: Suggs of Madness
 Sep 5: Myf, Adam and Alan of Spicks and Specks
 Sep 12: Sia
 Sep 19: The Kills
 Sep 26: Alice in Chains
 Oct 3: Four Tet
 Oct 17: Richard Lowenstein
 Oct 24: Wayne Coyne from The Flaming Lips
 Oct 31: Lamb of God
 Nov 7: Ross Wilson from Daddy Cool and Mondo Rock
 Nov 14: Greedy Smith and Martin Plaza from Mental as Anything
 Nov 21: Spiderbait
 Nov 28: Hilltop Hoods
 Dec 5: Friendly Fires
 Dec 12: Alkaline Trio
 Dec 19: Janette Beckman

2010
 Feb 6: Grizzly Bear
 Feb 20: Florence Welch from Florence and the Machine
 Feb 27: Patrick Wolf
 Mar 6: Bluejuice
 Mar 13: A-Trak
 Mar 20: Amanda Palmer
 Mar 27: Robot Chicken
 Apr 3: Animal Collective
 Apr 17: Bertie Blackman
 Apr 24: Bernard Fanning and Darren Middleton from Powderfinger
 May 8: John Safran
 May 15: Phoenix
 May 22: Operator Please
 May 29: Diplo
 Jun 5: Mastodon
 Jun 19: Bajo and Hex from Good Game
 Jun 26: Meat Loaf
 Jul 3: Karnivool
 Jul 10: Troy Cassar-Daley
 Jul 17: Mike Fielding
 Jul 24: Z Trip
 Jul 31: OK Go
 Aug 7: The Cat Empire
 Aug 14: Sally Seltmann
 Aug 28: K-OS
 Sep 4: Xavier Rudd
 Sep 18: Washington
 Sep 25: Yeasayer
 Oct 2: Old Man River
 Oct 9: Band of Horses
 Oct 16: Bret Easton Ellis
 Oct 30: Dan Kelly
 Nov 6: The Last Kinection
 Nov 13: Angus & Julia Stone
 Nov 20: Midnight Juggernauts
 Nov 27: Parkway Drive
 Dec 4: DJ Spinderella
 Dec 11: Tony Mott
 Dec 18: Wiley

2011
 Feb 12: Joan Jett & The Blackhearts
 Feb 19: The National
 Feb 26: PVT
 Mar 12: Dropkick Murphys
 Mar 19: CocoRosie
 Mar 26: Arj Barker
 Apr 2: Wire
 Apr 9: Best Coast
 Apr 16: Rahzel formally from The Roots & DJ JS1
 Apr 23: Jon Spencer from Jon Spencer Blues Explosion
 May 7: Birds of Tokyo
 May 14: Sharon Jones from Sharon Jones & The Dap-Kings
 May 21: Foals
 May 28: Art Vs Science
 Jun 4: Airbourne
 Jun 11: Neil Gaiman and Amanda Palmer
 Jun 25: Two Door Cinema Club
 Jul 2: Bat For Lashes
 Jul 9: Warwick Thornton
 Jul 16: Martin Solveig
 Jul 23: The Wombats
 Jul 30: The Vines
 Aug 6: Sneaky Sound System
 Aug 20: Rob Zombie
 Aug 27: Les Savy Fav
 Sep 3: Toby Creswell, Craig Mathieson and John O'Donnell
 Sep 10: Jimmy Barnes, Ian Moss, Don Walker and Phil Small from Cold Chisel
 Sep 24: Kimbra
 Oct 1: Phrase
 Oct 8: Alice Cooper
 Oct 15: Example
 Oct 22: Baron Wolman
 Nov 5: Boy & Bear
 Nov 12: Horrorshow
 Nov 19: The Jezabels
 Nov 26: Bag Raiders
 Dec 3: Iva Davies of Icehouse
 Dec 10: Bloody Beetroots
 Dec 17: Suzi Quatro

2012
 Feb 4: Arctic Monkeys
 Feb 18: Architecture in Helsinki
 Feb 25: Geoff Barrow of Portishead
 Mar 10: Kitty Daisy and Lewis
 Mar 17: Ladyhawke
 Mar 24: Jesse Peretz from The Lemonheads
 Mar 31: David Stewart from The Tourists, Eurythmics and SuperHeavy
 Apr 7: Chairlift
 Apr 14: Wild Flag
 Apr 28: M83
 May 5: Gavin Rossdale of Bush
 May 12: Children Collide
 May 19: The Temper Trap
 May 26: Gang of Four
 Jun 9: Shaun Micallef
 Jun 16: Imogen Heap
 Jun 23: Zola Jesus
 Jun 30: Dan Sultan and Archie Roach
 Jul 7: Keith Urban
 Jul 14: Van She
 Jul 21: The Bamboos
 Aug 4: Kate Miller-Heidke
 Aug 11: Blood Orange
 Aug 18: Billy Corgan from The Smashing Pumpkins
 Sep 1: Gotye
 Sep 8: The xx
 Sep 15: The Pharcyde
 Sep 29: Tim & Eric
 Oct 6: Tame Impala
 Oct 13: Cannibal Corpse
 Oct 20: Dappled Cities
 Nov 3: Rob Hirst and Jim Moginie from Midnight Oil
 Nov 10: Lanie Lane
 Nov 17: Grinspoon
 Dec 1: Missy Higgins
 Dec 8: F Buttons
 Dec 15: Rick Astley

2013
 Feb 2: Sarah Blasko
 Feb 9: Django Django
 Feb 16: Margaret Pomeranz and David Stratton
 Feb 23: GRIMES
 Mar 9: Mike Patton from Faith No More
 Mar 16: The Presets
 Mar 23: Beach House
 Apr 6: Silversun Pickups
 Apr 13: Jim Kerr from Simple Minds
 Apr 20: Urthboy
 Apr 27: Regina Spektor
 May 4: Tegan and Sara
 May 11: Vampire Weekend
 May 18: Chris Bailey from The Saints
 May 18: Robyne Dunn
 May 25: Liars
 Jun 1: FOALS
 Jun 8: Something for Kate
 Jun 15: Mikael Åkerfeldt and Fredrik Åkesson from Opeth
 Jun 22: Hot Chip
 Jun 29: Steve Albini
 Jul 6: Bliss N Eso
 Jul 13: Wayne Blair
 Jul 20: Bill Oddie from The Goodies
 Aug 3: James Dean Bradfield and Nicky Wire from Manic Street Preachers
 Aug 10: Cloud Control
 Aug 17: Karnivool
 Aug 24: Haim
 Aug 31: Anthony Albanese, Julie Bishop and Adam Bandt
 Sep 7: MS MR
 Sep 14: Cosmic Psychos
 Sep 21: Of Monsters and Men
 Oct 5: Passion Pit
 Oct 12: Moby
 Oct 19: Wavves
 Oct 26: Portugal.The Man
 Nov 2: Josh Pyke
 Nov 9: Elefant Traks
 Nov 16: Cut Copy
 Nov 23: Brian Ritchie from Violent Femmes
 Nov 30: AlunaGeorge
 Dec 7: Kim Wilde
 Dec 14: Rudimental

2014
 Feb 1: Spiderbait
 Feb 8: Nile Rodgers from Chic
 Feb 15: Pond
 Mar 1: Le1f
 Mar 8: Ghost
 Mar 15: Danny Brown
 Mar 22: The Sunnyboys
 Mar 29: Kurt Vile
 Apr 5: Ball Park Music
 Apr 12: The Scientists
 Apr 19: Dan Sultan
 Apr 26: The Jezabels
 May 3: Ian Astbury from The Cult
 May 10: Phoenix
 May 17: Holy Fuck
 May 24: St Vincent
 May 31: Primitive Calculators
 Jun 7: The Amity Affliction
 Jun 14: Josh Homme from Queens of the Stone Age
 Jun 21: The Hard Ons
 Jul 5: Busby Marou
 Jul 12: Aborted
 Jul 19: Irvine Welsh
 Aug 2: HTRK
 Aug 16: Psycroptic
 Aug 23: Violent Soho
 Sep 6: 360
 Sep 13: Royal Blood
 Sep 20: Cris Kirkwood from Meat Puppets
 Oct 4: Jimmy Barnes
 Oct 11: Megan Washington
 Oct 18: Kristian Nairn
 Oct 25: Radio Birdman
 Nov 1: The Mark of Cain
 Nov 8: Kasey Chambers
 Nov 15: The Madden Brothers
 Nov 22: I Killed The Prom Queen
 Nov 29: Russell Morris
 Dec 6: Anthony Fantano
 Dec 13: Iceage
 Dec 20: Jack Ladder

2015
 Feb 7: The Meanies
 Feb 21: Dan Deacon
 Feb 28: Neneh Cherry
 Mar 7: Perfume Genius
 Mar 14: Alt J
 Mar 21: Run The Jewels
 Mar 28: British India
 Apr 4: Caribou
 Apr 11: Judas Priest
 Apr 18: Sharon Van Etten
 Apr 25: Noel Fielding
 May 2: Millencolin
 May 9: Glass Animals
 May 16: Tony Hadley and Gary Kemp from Spandau Ballet
 May 23: Jebediah
 May 30: A$AP Ferg
 Jun 6: The Pop Group
 Jun 13: Giorgio Moroder
 Jun 20: Craig Nicholls from The Vines
 Jul 4: King Parrot
 Jul 11: Thelma Plum
 Jul 25: Northlane
 Aug 8: Seth Sentry
 Aug 15: Alpine
 Aug 22: Dead Letter Circus
 Aug 29: Tumbleweed
 Sep 5: Daniel Johns
 Sep 12: The Church
 Sep 19: The Rubens
 Sep 26: Kevin Smith and Jason Mewes
 Oct 3: Parkway Drive
 Oct 10: The Smith Street Band
 Oct 17: Hermitude
 Oct 24: Joey Bada$$
 Oct 31: 5 Seconds of Summer
 Nov 7: My Disco
 Nov 14: Tina Arena
 Nov 21: Robert Forster
 Dec 5: The Clean
 Dec 12: Costa Georgiadis
 Dec 19: King Gizzard and the Lizard Wizard

2016
 Feb 6: Royal Headache
 Feb 13: Mac DeMarco
 Feb 20: City and Colour
 Feb 27: Courtney Barnett, Jen Cloher and Fraser A. Gorman
 Mar 12: DMA's
 Mar 19: Neon Indian
 Apr 2: Ariel Pink
 Apr 9: Custard
 Apr 16: HEALTH
 Apr 23: Noel Fielding (repeat of the 25 April 2015 episode)
 May 7: Ganggajang
 May 21: Kate Ceberano
 May 28: Cherie Currie from The Runaways
 Jun 4: The Drones
 Jun 11: Twin Peaks
 Jun 18: Hiatus Kaiyote
 Jul 2: Steel Panther
 Jul 9: Southeast Desert Metal
 Jul 16: MS MR
 Jul 23: Deafheaven
 Aug 6: Gypsy & The Cat
 Aug 13: Recovery hosted by Dylan Lewis & Jane Gazzo
 Aug 20: Bernard Fanning
 Aug 27: James Vincent McMorrow
 Sep 10: Grouplove
 Sep 17: REMI
 Oct 1: Sticky Fingers
 Oct 8: Totally Unicorn
 Oct 15: Lisa Mitchell
 Oct 29: Empire of the Sun
 Nov 5: Tkay Maidza
 Nov 12: David Wilson
 Nov 19: Ben Lee
 Nov 26: Illy
 Dec 3: Marilyn Manson, Wiz Khalifa and Connan Mockasin (compilation of half-finished, previously unaired guest-programming slots)
 Dec 10: Shirley Manson, Steve Marker & Duke Erikson from Garbage
 Dec 17: Eric Andre

2017
 Feb 4: Dune Rats
 Feb 11: Twelve Foot Ninja
 Feb 18: The xx
 Feb 25: Peter Garrett and Jim Moginie from Midnight Oil
 Mar 11: Holly Throsby
 Mar 18: A Day To Remember
 Mar 25: Scott Hutchison and Grant Hutchison from Frightened Rabbit
 Apr 1: Thundamentals
 Apr 8: Catfish and the Bottlemen
 Apr 29: James Mercer from The Shins
 May 6: Underground Lovers
 May 13: Kingswood
 May 20: Tom Meighan from Kasabian
 May 27: All Time Low
 Jun 3: The Clouds
 Jun 10: Bad//Dreems
 Jun 17: Suggs of Madness
 Jul 1: El Guincho
 Jul 8: Amanda Brown and Lindy Morrison of The Go-Betweens
 Jul 15: Meg Mac
 Jul 22: Kirin J. Callinan
 Aug 5: Warren Fu
 Aug 12: Hanson
 Aug 19: Corey Taylor of Slipknot and Stone Sour
 Aug 26: Steve Lucas of X
 Sep 2: Gang of Youths
 Sep 9: Spoon
 Sep 16: The Preatures
 Sep 23: Dominic and Stuart from Mogwai
 Sep 30: Ron Peno and Brett Myers from Died Pretty
 Oct 7: The Jungle Giants
 Oct 14: Future Islands
 Nov 4: Cub Sport
 Nov 18: Whitfield Crane from Ugly Kid Joe
 Nov 25: Pete Tong
 Dec 2: Daryl Braithwaite from Sherbet
 Dec 9: Melvins
 Dec 16: San Cisco
 Dec 23: Pissed Jeans

2018
 Feb 3: DZ Deathrays
 Feb 10: Craig David
 Feb 17: Hockey Dad
 Feb 24: The Stems
 Mar 3: Vance Joy
 Mar 10: Kerser
 Mar 17: Phoenix
 Mar 24: Wolf Alice
 Apr 7: Aunty Donna
 Apr 14: Donny Benét
 Apr 21: Ruban Nielson from Unknown Mortal Orchestra
 May 5: Parkway Drive
 May 12: Alison Wonderland
 May 19: Courtney Barnett
 May 26: Peking Duk
 Jun 9: Chuck D, Tim Commerford and DJ Lord from Prophets of Rage
 Jun 16: The Presets
 Jun 23: The Mavis's
 Jun 30: Camp Cope
 Jul 7: Luca Brasi
 Jul 21: Amy Shark
 Aug 4: Alice Glass
 Aug 11: Painters and Dockers
 Aug 18: Franz Ferdinand
 Aug 25: Osher Günsberg
 Sep 1: Neko Case
 Sep 8: Trent Reznor from Nine Inch Nails (repeat of the 6 February 2000 episode)
 Sep 15: The Amity Affliction
 Sep 29: Ed Kuepper and Peter Oxley from The Aints!
 Oct 6: The Screaming Jets
 Oct 13: Tom Morello from Rage Against the Machine & The Nightwatchman & Prophets of Rage
 Oct 20: Mojo Juju
 Nov 3: Todd Rundgren
 Nov 10: RÜFÜS DU SOL
 Nov 17: Charli XCX
 Nov 24: Kirkis

2019
 Feb 16: Methyl Ethel
 Feb 23: Tex Perkins and Kim Salmon from The Beasts (formerly Beasts of Bourbon)
 Mar 9: Little Simz
 Mar 16: Joan Jett and Kenny Laguna
 Mar 23: Nergal from Behemoth
 Mar 30: Parquet Courts
 Apr 6: Sum 41
 Apr 13: Anderson .Paak
 Apr 20: Dan Sultan
 Apr 27: Ian Hill, Richie Faulkner and Scott Travis of Judas Priest
 May 4: Paul Mac
 May 11: J Mascis of Dinosaur Jr.
 May 25: The Veronicas
 Jun 1: Jimmy Barnes
 Jun 8: IDLES
 Jun 15: AURORA
 Jun 22: Tobias Forge
 Jun 29: Carl Cox and Eric Powell
 Jul 6: Bring Me the Horizon
 Jul 13: Bad Apples Music
 Jul 20: Christine and The Queens
 Aug 3: Hilltop Hoods
 Aug 10: Seeker Lover Keeper
 Aug 17: Killswitch Engage
 Aug 24: Jungle
 Aug 31: Nathaniel Rateliff & The Night Sweats
 Sep 7: Thrice
 Sep 14: The Chats
 Sep 28: Mi-Sex
 Oct 5: Regurgitator
 Oct 12: Boy & Bear
 Oct 19: Ride
 Oct 26: Devin Townsend
 Nov 2: Amyl and the Sniffers
 Nov 9: Richard Lowenstein
 Nov 16: Paul Kelly
 Nov 23: Jessica Mauboy
 Nov 30: The Murlocs
 Dec 7: Adam Franklin from Swervedriver
 Dec 14: Apocalyptica

2020
 
 Feb 8: Denzel Curry
 Feb 15: Amanda Palmer
 Feb 22: Polaris
 Mar 7: Halestorm
 Mar 21: The Dandy Warhols
 Mar 28: Weyes Blood
 Apr 4: Milky Chance
 Apr 18: Ed O'Brien from Radiohead
 May 2: Alex Cameron & Roy Molloy
 May 9: Mike Patton & Faith No More (compilation of previous guest programming slots from 1990, 1995, 1997, 2007 & 2013)
 May 16: Sleaford Mods
 May 23: TISM (25th anniversary repeat of the 20 May 1995 episode)
 Jun 6: Mark McEntee from The Divinyls
 Jun 20: Lagwagon
 Jun 27: Even
 Jul 4: Slipknot (20th anniversary repeat of the 18 March 2000 episode)
 Jul 18: I Prevail
 Jul 25: The Naked and Famous
 Aug 1: Garbage (repeat of the 13 November 1999 episode, to mark 25th anniversary of the band's first album)
 Aug 15: David McCormack from Custard
 Aug 29: Dave Grohl and Franz Stahl from Foo Fighters (repeat of 21 March 1998 episode)
 Sep 12: Marilyn Manson (repeat programming slots from the 6 February 1999 and 3rd December 2016)
 Sep 26: Orbital 
 Oct 3: No Doubt (20th anniversary repeat of the 3 June 2000 episode)
 Oct 17: Tommy Lee from Mötley Crüe
 Oct 24: Ball Park Music
 Oct 31: Alice Cooper (repeat of the 8 October 2011 episode, to mark Halloween)
 Nov 14: Briggs
 Nov 21: Ruel
 Nov 28: Something For Kate
 Dec 6: Nat's What I Reckon
 Dec 12: Julien Temple (introducing music videos directed by him)

2021
 Jan 23: Metallica (compilation of programming slots from 1991, 1996 & 2004 to mark the band's 40th anniversary)
 Jan 31: Psychedelic Porn Crumpets
 Mar 5: Michael Gudinski (Tribute to guest programmer done in 2014 never gone to air before on rage)
 Mar 13: Genesis Owusu
 Mar 20: Sarah McLeod
 Mar 27: Amy Lee from Evanescence
 Apr 3: The Mars Volta (repeat of 23 Aug 2008 episode)
 Apr 10: Tex Perkins and Kim Salmon from The Beasts, formerly Beasts Of Bourbon (repeat of Feb 23 2019 episode in tribute to late drummer Tony Pola)
 Apr 24: William Zeglis from The Rubens
 May 1: Julia Stone
 May 15: Tim Rogers from You Am I
 May 29: Amy Shark
 June 5: Crowded House
 June 12: Noel Gallagher
 June 19: The Avalanches
 June 26: Theo and Joel from Wolf Alice
 July 3: Middle Kids
 July 17: Mike D, Ad-Rock & Adam Yauch from Beastie Boys (compilation of programming slots from 1994 & 2007 to mark group's 40th anniversary)
 July 26: Gary Numan
 July 31: Sam Hales from The Jungle Giants
 Aug 7: Southeast Desert Metal (repeat of 9 July 2016 episode)
 Aug 14: Polish Club
 Aug 21: Sonic Youth (compilation of programming slots from 1998 & 2004 to mark group's 40th anniversary)
 Aug 28: Chvrches
 Sept 4: Tropical Fuck Storm
 Sept 11: Jack Ladder
 Sept 18: Archie Roach
 Oct 16: Matt Tuck from Bullet for My Valentine
 Oct 23: The Wiggles
 Oct 30: John Carpenter (Halloween special)
 Nov 6: Rufus Du Sol
 Nov 13: Courtney Barnett
 Nov 20: Miami Horror
 Nov 27: Alice Skye
 Dec 4: Ladyhawke
 Dec 11: De La Soul (20th anniversary repeat of 22 Dec 2001 episode)

2022
 Jan 1: Crowded House (repeat from June 5, 2021)
 Jan 8: Julia Stone (repeat from May 1, 2021)
 Jan 15: Archie Roach (repeat from September 18, 2021)
 Jan 22: Genesis Owusu (repeat from March 13, 2021)
 Jan 29: Ocean Alley
 Feb 5: Meat Loaf (excerpts from June 26, 2010, episode as part of tribute special)
 Feb 25: Mark Lanegan & Van Conner from Screaming Trees (excerpts from 22 April 1995 episode in tribute to Mark Lanegan)
 Mar 13: Kate Miller-Heidke
 Mar 19: Gavin Rossdale from Bush
 Mar 26: Dave Faulkner from Hoodoo Gurus
 Apr 2: Confidence Man
 Apr 9: Hugo Gruzman from Flight Facilities
 Apr 16: The Linda Lindas
 Apr 30: Marcus Bridge from Northlane
 May 7: Pierre Bouvier from Simple Plan
 May 14: Peking Duk
 May 28: Camp Cope
 June 4: Hiatus Kaiyote
 June 18: The Lazy Eyes
 June 25: George Pettit from Alexisonfire
 July 9: Tasman Keith
 July 16: Stand Atlantic
 July 24: Phil Jamieson
 Aug 6: King Stingray
 Aug 13: Spacey Jane
 Aug 20: Orville Peck
 Aug 27: Isabella Manfredi
 Sept 3: The Hu
 Sept 17: Winston McCall from Parkway Drive
 Sept 24: Sampa The Great
 Oct 1: Tegan & Sara
 Oct 8: Darren Hayes
 Oct 15: Benee
 Oct 22: Beabadoobee
 Oct 30: Jacoby Shaddix from Papa Roach (Halloween special)
 Nov 5: Eskimo Joe
 Nov 12: Spiderbait
 Nov 19: TISM
 Nov 26: Emma Donovan & The Putbacks
 Dec 3: Alter Boy

2023
 Jan 14: Kate Miller-Heidke (repeat from 13 March 2022)
 Jan 21: Dave Faulkner from Hoodoo Gurus (repeat from 26 March 2022)
 Jan 28: King Stingray (repeat from 6 Aug 2022)
 Mar 3: Alexis Taylor & Owen Clarke from Hot Chip
 Mar 11: The Beths
 Mar 18: Fontaines D.C.

External links 

 , including archived programs since 2010

References 

Rage guest programmers
Rage